Miki Yeung (born 14 February 1985) is a Hong Kong cantopop singer and actress. In 2002, she joined the cantopop music idol group Cookies. In 2005, her film b420 was awarded the Grand Prix Award: The 19th Fukuoka Asian Film Festival. Currently she is the TV hostess of the programme Love Academy for the J2 channel. In 2012, she signed an artiste contract with TVB.

Discography

As part of Cookies

As part of Mini Cookies

Filmography

References

External links
 
 MikiYeung.net
 MikiYeung@b420 (click poster, sound & video)
 MikiYeung@cookies (sound & video)

1985 births
Living people
Cantopop singers
21st-century Hong Kong women singers
21st-century Hong Kong actresses
Cookies (group) members